Occupy This Album: 99 Songs for the 99 Percent is a four-disc compilation box set released in May 2012 through the record label Music for Occupy. The album concept, and initial production was initiated by Executive Producer Jason Samel. Jason Samel later recruited Producers Maegan Hayward, Alex Emanuel and Shirley Menard to assist with the project. The set consists of 99 songs inspired by or related to the Occupy movement. Proceeds from the album went "directly towards the needs of sustaining this growing movement."

Composition
Occupy This Album is a four-disc compilation box set containing 76 songs by various artists; the digital version contains 99 tracks.

Michael Moore contributed vocals on his cover of Bob Dylan's "The Times They Are a-Changin'", produced by Jason Samel and Eric Weinrib, a song he had previously performed in his 1998 film The Big One. Moore, who had been approached to direct a music video for the compilation, is accompanied by Tom Chapin on guitar and harmonica. Approximately two thirds of the way into the track, Moore leads a human microphone chorus with the chant: "We are here to conduct an intervention".

One of the album's standout tracks "We Can't Make It Here" was written and performed by James McMurtry and recorded along with Steve Earle and Joan Baez on vocals. Critically acclaimed, it's been cited among The Nation'''s "Best Protest Songs Ever"; one of the "25 Best Songs of the 2000s" in Rolling Stone magazine; and declared "a triumph — the anthem of the 99%," by Bob Lefsetz.

Promotion
City Winery in New York City hosted a record release party on May 8, 2012, which included performances by Matt Pless, the initial inspiration for the album. Other performers included Ace Reporter, David Amram, Angels of Vice, Jennie Arnau, Richard Barone, Chroma, Dave Dreiwitz, and Kevin Twigg, the Fear Nuttin Band, Nanci Griffith with Pete Kennedy and Maura Kennedy, DJ Logic, Jesse Lenat, Los Cintron, George Martinez and The Global Block Collective, Michael Moore with Tom Chapin, Rejectionist Front, Greg Smith and Broken English, and Taj Weekes.

Critical reception

Critical reception of the album was mixed. In his review for Entertainment Weekly, Kyle Anderson gave the compilation series a B+ rating and wrote, "the spirit of the compilation feels more positive than negative — the best that can be asked of any grassroots revolution". Josh Harkinson of Mother Jones'' called the album a "mashup of sometimes discordant messages" lacking in "musical cohesion", though he complimented the album's "star power" and felt the best songs were contributed by rappers.

Many reviewers criticized or complimented select tracks. Anderson's favorite songs included Ace Reporter's "propulsive" rendition of "The World Is on Fire" and Deborah Harry's "glitchy" "Safety in Numbers". Harkinson called Michael Moore's version of the Bob Dylan song "The Times They Are a-Changin'" "rotten", but considered Third Eye Blind's "If There Ever Was a Time" a "gem".

Occupy This Album won the Independent Music Awards VOX Populi vote for Best Compilation of 2012.

Track listing

 Disc 1
 "Something's Got to Give" (Matt Pless) – 4:18
 "Come On, Come On, Come On" (Jackson Browne) – 5:39
 "Occupation Freedom" (Global Block Collective, Martinez) – 2:38
 "People Have the Power" (Patti Smith) – 5:37
 "Love Anthem (Only Love)" (My Pet Dragon) – 4:00
 "The Panic Is On" (Loudon Wainwright III) – 2:56
 "Occulture" (Cosmonaut) – 4:13
 "Save Us" (Rain Phoenix and Papercranes) – 2:49
 "Smile (Get Up and Sing)" (Jay Samel) – 6:50
 "This Is What America Looks Like" (DJ Logic) – 3:37
 "Big Little Wolfs" (Aeroplane Pageant) – 2:56
 "Agent 99" (Alex Emanuel) – 3:26
 "Safety in Numbers" (Deborah Harry) – 3:58
 "Hey, Can I Sleep on Your Futon?" (Richard Barone) – 4:24
 "Occupy Wall Street (Here Here Here)" (Black Dragon) – 2:34
 "White Gold" (Ladytron) – 5:02
 "Greed" (Aldort) – 3:33
 "Against the Machine" (Adowa, Weekes) – 3:59
 "The Young Idealists" (Cole) – 2:42
 "A Peaceful Solution" (Amy Nelson, Willie Nelson) – 3:52

 Disc 2
 "The Times They Are a-Changin'", performed by Michael Moore (Bob Dylan) – 3:41
 "The World Is on Fire" (Ace Reporter) – 3:08
 "Latter Days" (Middle Eight) – 3:39
 "Turn the Lights On" (Chroma) – 4:36
 "Which Side Are You On?" (Ani DiFranco) – 6:05
 "Well May the World Go" (Tao Rodriguez-Seeger) – 4:49
 "Unified Tribes" (Thievery Corporation) – 3:14
 "Robber Barons" (Thee Oh Sees) – 5:16
 "Saving Up to Go Bankrupt" (Rimbaud) – 3:40
 "Hell No (I'm Not Alright)" (Nanci Griffith) – 2:49
 "We Stand as One" (Joseph Arthur) – 5:18
 "Cash Machine" (Girls Against Boys) – 3:33
 "Rebellion Politik" (Junkyard Empire) – 3:32
 "Nothing Recedes Like Progress" (Anti-Flag) – 2:07
 "Rebel" (Fear Nuttin' Band) – 3:36
 "Under the Bridge" (Doe, Sobule) – 2:58
 "Take a Stand" (Said) – 5:00
 "The Answer" (Unkle) – 4:41
 "World Wide Rebel Songs" (Freedom Fighter Orchestra) – 3:02
 "If There Ever Was a Time" (Third Eye Blind) – 3:26

 Disc 3
 "Move on Fast" (Yoko Ono) – 3:41
 "If We Live" (Build the Sun) – 3:41
 "Fight the Good Fight" (Our Lady Peace) – 3:41
 "I Don't Need Money" (Bonnie) – 3:09
 "The World Is Turning" (Toots and the Maytals) – 4:13
 "A New York Minute" (Nickodemus) – 3:38
 "I Ain't No Brian Wilson" (Gentleman Brawlers) – 4:52
 "Industrial Park" (Mammals) – 6:00
 "Big Fish" (Lost City Rumblers, Yo La Tengo) – 3:21
 "Occu-Pie" (Hayward) – 3:31
 "Free" (Mystic Bowie) – 5:27
 "Oye Mi Voz" (Los Cintron) – 3:49
 "Walk On" (Wonderland) – 3:58
 "Coney Island Winter" (Jeffreys) – 3:48
 "China Basin Digs" (Joel Rafael, Trudell) – 3:21
 "Walkin'" (Pimps of Joytime) – 5:38
 "River's Gonna Rise" (Warren Haynes) – 7:59
 "Rich Man's World" (Immortal Technique) – 4:41
 "Staying Out and Calling In" (Danger Field) – 1:28

 Disc 4
 "We Can't Make It Here" (Joan Baez, Steve Earle, James McMurtry) – 6:03
 "We Are" (New Party Systems) – 4:07
 "Revolution" (Nova Echo) – 3:00
 "Number One" (Born I Music) – 4:33
 "Play the Greed" (Williams) – 3:08
 "Broke Heart Blues" (Elliott) – 3:57
 "What Are Their Names" (David Crosby, Graham Nash) – 1:19
 "Make a Stand" (Chambers) – 5:12
 "Better Luck Next Time" (Arnau) – 4:06
 "All Over the World" (Arlo Guthrie) – 2:54
 "We're the 99" (Diamond) – 4:17
 "We Are Human" (Mike & Ruthy) – 4:08
 "Blessed" (Williams) – 5:49
 "Freedom of Speech" (Carter) – 4:28
 "Reclaim" (Rejectionist Front) – 3:39
 "Occupy (We the 99)" (Jasiri X) – 2:55
 "Earth Division" (Mogwai) – 6:01
 "Pulse" (OWS Drum Circle; Brendan Hunt) – 3:05
 "The Times They Are a-Changin' [Skiffle Version]" (Moore) – 3:21 [hidden track]

 Digital Only
 Andrew Vladeck – "Chasing the Sun"
 Greg Smith and The  Broken English – "Livin' Like a Joker"
 Aliza Hava – "Rise"
 The Occubility Bros. – "Crashed IT, Stashed IT" *
 Chris Pierce – "Invisible People"
 Amanda Palmer – "Ukulele Anthem" *
 Nadirah Shakoor – "Tree of Life"
 Hanne Hukkelberg – "On My Wall"
 Jason White – "Little Pieces of Plastic"
 mfmadness – "Never Be Defeated"
 Renegade Creation – "Greedy Life" *
 Jesse Lenat – "99%"
 The Swedes – "On The Dole"
 Bill Mlotok – "Brazilia" *
 Marcus Blake – "Don't Taser Me, Bro!"
 Angels of Vice – "We Are The 99″
 The Layaways – "Silence"
 Mother Feather – "Mother Feather" *
 Thorin Caristo – "Common Man" *
 Machan – "Everyday"
 Vannucci (feat. Robert Brentley) – "Crashing Down" *
 David Amram – "Time to Occupy" *
Previously unreleased

Track listing adapted from Allmusic.

Personnel

 Gabriel Acosta-Cohen – Percussion, Vocals
 C. C. Adcock – Mixing, Producer
 Aeroplane Pageant – Composer, Producer
 Gabriel Aldort – Arranger, Composer, Piano, Vocals
 Miguel Alvarado – Saxophone
 Elijah Amitin – Beats, Composer, Producer
 David Amram – Penny Whistle, Piano, Vocals
 Matt Anthony – Mixing
 Anti-Flag – Composer, Engineer, Percussion, Producer, Various
 Michael Areethituk – Guitar
 Jennie Arnau – Composer, Guitar, Vocals
 Joseph Arthur – Composer
 Barny – Engineer, Mixing
 Richard Barone – Bass, Composer, Guitar, Vocals
 Jack Barrett – Group Member
 Basic Tracks – Engineer
 Ray Benson – Composer, Guitar (Acoustic), Tambourine
 Jeff Berksley – Percussion
 Jeremy Bernstein – Vocals
 Bryan Berry – Composer
 Matthew Billy – Composer, Additional Guitar (Acoustic), Mixing, Producer
 Craig Bishop – Hammond B3, Horn
 Black Dragon – Percussion, Vocals
 Cindy Blackman – Drums
 Norm Block – Drums
 Julie B. Bonnie – Composer
 Jason Borger – Piano
 Born I Music – Composer
 Mark Bosch – Guitar (Electric), Organ, Piano, Producer
 Dakota Bowman – Assistant Engineer
 Gary Braglia – Composer, Guitars
 Eric Brigmond – Keyboards
 Neil Brockbank – Engineer
 Bassy Bob Brockman – Mixing
 Brooklyn Youth Chorus – Choir, Chorus
 Iddan Brown – Vocals
 Rick Brown – Drums, Vocals
 Jackson Browne – Composer, Producer, Vocals
 Malik Burke – Composer
 Fernando Bustamente – Composer, Producer
 Ray Calendar – Trumpet
 Fitzroy Campbell – Composer
 Candy John Carr – Bongos, Drums, Percussion
 Clifford Carter – Organ
 Kanaska Carter – Composer, Guitar, Vocals
 Elaine Caswell – Vocals (Background)
 Alexia Chakour – Vocals (Background)
 Dylan Chambers – Composer, Producer
 Lester Chambers – Producer, Spoken Word
 Tom Chapin – Guitar, Harmonica, Vocals
 Chauncey Yearwood – Composer
 Dan Choma – Composer
 Jay Chung – Composer
 Cristobal Cintron – Composer, Guitar, Percussion, Vocals
 Rafael Cintron – Bass, Composer, Guitar, Vocals
 Gavin Clark – Vocals
 Pablo Clements – Composer, Group Member
 Reuben Cohen – Mastering
 Cole El Saleh – Keyboards
 Jane Cole – Drums
 Lloyd Cole – Composer, Producer
 Steve Connely – Producer
 John Conte – Bass
 Matt Cooker – Cello
 Christopher Cox – Composer
 David Crosby – Composer, Producer, Vocals
 Tim Curry – Vocals (Background)
 Brian Daigle – Composer
 Daniel Lancaster – Guitar, Vocals
 Jay Dee Daugherty – Drums
 Dannielle DeAndrea – Vocals
 Michael DeLorenzo – Drums
 Phil Demetro – Mastering
 Grady Dennis – Tambourine
 Rick DePofi – Hammond B3, Horn, Horn Arrangements, Sax (Tenor)
 Lauren Diamond – Composer, Vocals
 Cedric Diaz – Keyboards
 Paul Dieter – Engineer, Mixing
 Ani DiFranco – Composer, Producer, Vocals
 Frank DiNardo – Vocals
 DJ Logic – Producer, Turntables
 John Doe – Guitar, Vocals
 Dave Dreiwitz – Bass (Upright), Vocals
 Henrik Drescher – Artwork
 Chuck Dunham – Vocals
 John Dwyer – Composer
 Bob Dylan – Composer
 Marshal Dylon – Keyboards
 Robin Eaton – Composer
 Chris Edwards – Keyboards
 Dylan Egon – Artwork
 Jenny Electrik – Moog Synthesizer, Theremin
 Ronny Elliott – Composer
 Alex Emanuel – Art Direction, Bass, Composer, Drums, Guitar, Guitar (Bass), Liner Notes, Photography, Producer, Sleeve Photo, Vocal Harmony, Vocals
 Evan Bradford – Engineer, Guitar, Keyboards, Mastering, Mixing, Producer, Vocals
 David First – Arranger, Composer, Guitar, Producer, Vocals
 Alexis Fleisig – Drums
 Chris Fletcher – Bass
 Guy Forsyth – Harmonica
 Ruthie Foster – Vocals (Background)
 Mike Fowler – Bass
 Becca Fox – Group Member
 Greg Fox – Drums
 Justin Francis – Mixing, Percussion, Various
 Jay Frederick – Drums
 Paul Frye – Engineer, Mixing, Producer
 Glenn Fukunaga – Bass
 Don Fury – Engineer, Mastering, Producer
 Bernard Gann – Bass
 Sue Garner – Guitar, Vocals
 Chris Gehringer – Mastering
 Stephen George – Engineer, Mixing, Producer
 Mass Giorgini – Mastering
 Girls Against Boys – Composer
 Brian Gitkin – Composer
 Mick Glossop – Mixing
 Jodi Gold – Vocals
 Mark Goldenberg – Guitar
 Eric Gorman – Remixing
 Chris Grainger – Engineer
 Alex Grey – Artwork
 Brian Griffin – Drums, Percussion
 J. Griffin – Composer
 James Griffith – Vocals
 Nanci Griffith – Composer, Guitar (Acoustic), Producer, Vocals
 Robert Grossman – Back Cover
 Steve Hegener - Bass
 Clara Guererro – Vocals
 Joe Guerra – Bass, Vocals
 Clara Guerrero – Composer
 Abe Guthrie – Keyboards
 Annie Guthrie – Vocals
 Arlo Guthrie – Composer, Keyboards, Vocals
 Krishna Guthrie – Guitar
 Sarah Lee Guthrie – Vocals
 Patrick Guyers – Drums
 Nigel Hall – Keyboards
 Terry Hall – Drums
 Nick Hallett – Vocals
 Patrick Hambrick – Guitar
 Caleb Hanks – Composer, Producer, Vocals
 Deborah Harry – Composer
 J. Walter Hawkes – Trombone
 Warren Haynes – Composer, Guitar, Vocals
 Harry Hayward – Composer
 Harry Alexander Hayward – Composer
 Maegan Hayward – Liner Notes, Producer
 Jacob Hempbill – Composer
 Brett Hestla – Bass, Guitar, Producer, Vocals (Background)
 Frederick Hibbert – Composer
 Terrence Higgins – Drums
 Mira Hirsch – Vocals
 Matt Hixon – Bass, Vocals
 Ron Holloway – Sax (Tenor)
 Sonny Hopkins – Drums
 Georgia Hubley – Drums, Vocals
 Daniel Hunt – Producer
 Kevin Hunter – Mandolin
 Emma Ikediashi – Composer
 Illspokinn – Vocals
 Immortal Technique – Composer
 Victor Indrizzo – Drums
 Rami Jaffee – Organ (Hammond), Piano
 Eli Janney – Bass, Engineer, Vocals (Background)
 Jasiri X – Composer
 Garland Jeffreys – Composer, Guitar (Acoustic), Producer, Vocals
 Hezekiah Jenkins – Composer
 Stephan Jenkins – Composer, Producer
 Carl Johnson – Guitar
 Ron Johnson – Bass
 Karen Johnstone – Keyboards, Vocals
 Jesse Jones – Vocals
 Andre Jonson – Composer, Producer
 Harold Jorge – Vocals
 Martin Jørgensen – Group Member
 Ira Kaplan –  Guitar, Vocals
 Brian Karp – Bass
 Lori Karpay – Liner Notes
 Mike Katzman – Keyboards, Organ
 Lenny Kaye – Guitar, Vocals
 Brian Kelly – Composer, Guitar, Vocals
 Donna Kelly – Drums
 Andre Kelman – Assistant
 Maura Kennedy – Composer, Guitar, Producer, Tambourine, Vocals (Background)
 Pete Kennedy – Bass, Engineer, Guitar (Electric), Producer
 Jason Kibler – Composer
 Kid Loco – Producer
 Shelley King – Vocals (Background)
 Mike Kiramarios – Saxophone
 Willie Klein – Guitar, Vocals
 Lauren Kolesinskas – Artwork
 Dan Komin – Bass
 Chris Kuklis – Guitar
 Dhruv Kumar – Vocals
 Bret Kunash – Vocals
 Tyler Kweder – Vocals
 Jason Lader – Mixing, Producer
 Ladytron – Composer, Producer
 Rich Lamb – Engineer
 Tallinn Lamonaca – Drums, Percussion
 James Lavelle – Composer, Group Member
 Ian Lawrence – Composer
 Frosty Lawson – Horn
 Greg Leisz – Guitar (Electric)
 Zack Leopold – Group Member
 Alan Lerner – Drums
 Cynik Lethel – Composer, Producer
 Richard Levengood – Engineer
 Pete Levin – Hammond B3
 Mauricio Lewak – Drums
 Tom Lewandowski – Group Member
 Corey Lima – Composer
 Little Girl – Composer
 Daniel Littleton – Vocals
 Michael Lowry – Vocals
 Brian Lozenski – Composer
 Gavin Lurssen – Mastering
 Michael Patrick Lyons – Liner Notes
 Machan Taylor – Vocals (Background)
 Kevin Madigan – Engineer, Mixing
 Matthew Mallol – Guitar
 Kyp Malone – Vocals
 The Mammals – Composer
 John Paul Manley – Composer, Guitar, Vocals
 Adam Mantovani – Bass
 Colin Marston – Engineer
 George Martinez – Composer, Vocals
 Jeff Mattson – Guitar
 David Maurice – Composer, Engineer, Mixing, Moog Bass, Producer
 Val McCallum – Guitar (Electric)
 Scott McCloud – Guitar, Vocals
 Kevin McCormack – Bass
 Pat McInerney – Percussion, Producer, Vocals (Background)
 Thomas McIntyre – Drums
 Eric Busta - Drums
 Greg McMullen – Guitar
 David McTiernan – Keyboards, Vocals (Background)
 Shirley Menard – Legal Advisor, Liner Notes, Producer
 Rich Mercurio – Drums, Engineer, Percussion
 Michael Merenda – Bass, Composer, Drums, Engineer, Guitar, Mixing, Vocals
 Ralph Merigliano – Keyboards
 Todd Michaelsen – Composer, Engineer, Programming, Various, Vocals
 The Middle Eight – Composer
 Howard Miller – Composer
 Kyle Miller – Assistant
 Paul Miller – Guitar
 Alethea Mills – Vocals
 John Mills – Horn Arrangements, Saxophone
 George Mitchell – Bass
 Matthew Moadel – Drums
 Mogwai – Composer
 Michael Moore – Vocals
 Tom Morello – Composer
 Barbara Jean Morrison – Composer
 James MsNew – Bass, Vocals
 Music for Occupy – Mixing, Producer
 Seth Mysterka – Guitar
 Mystic Bowie – Vocals
 Lee Nadel – Bass
 Dafna Naphtali – Vocals
 Mike Napolitano – Mixing, Producer
 Graham Nash – Producer, Vocals
 Amy Nelson – Composer
 Chris Nelson – Tambourine, Vocals
 Willie Nelson – Composer
 Ted Niceley – Producer
 Jesse Nichols – Engineer
 Nickodemus – Composer
 Charles W. Nieland – Composer
 Butch Norton – Drums, Percussion
 Oz Noy – Guitar
 Graham O'Brien – Composer
 Liz O'Donnell – Vocals
 Caitlin Oliver-Gans – Group Member
 Jason Olshan – Composer, Guitar, Vocals
 Yoko Ono – Composer
 Our Lady Peace – Composer, Producer
 Rich Pagano – Drums, Mixing
 Phil Palazzolo – Mixing
 David Palmer – Tack Piano
 Karen Pals – Administration
 Jon Patton – Mandolin
 Barry Perlman – Legal Advisor
 Michael Perlman – Composer, Vocals
 Jack Petruzzelli – Guitar, Vocals
 Doug Pettibone – Guitar, Mandolin
 Rain Phoenix – Composer, Guitar (Acoustic), Vocals
 Brendan Picone – Bass
 Matt Pierce – Vocals
 Roni Pillischer – Assistant, Drums, Vocals
 Sam Pitt-Stoller – Group Member, Guitar (Acoustic)
 Mark Plati – Additional Production, Synthesizer
 Steve Plekan – Bass
 Matt Pless – Composer, Cover Art, Guitar, Harmonica, Vocals
 Zac Pless – Bass, Drums
 Jason Polo – Guitar
 Dirk Powell – Engineer
 Bob Power – Mastering
 Daniel Quinn – Vocal Harmony
 Rabbi Darkside – Vocals
 Jamaica Rafael – Violin, Vocals
 Joel Rafael – Composer, Guitar, Producer, Vocals
 Jeff Railsback – Vocals
 Chris Reagan – Composer
 The Real Live Show – Vocals
 Florence Reece – Composer
 Mike Rimbaud – Composer, Engineer, Guitar, Harmonica, Mixing, Organ, Producer, Vocals
 Tao Rodriguez-Seeger – Composer
 Jay Rodriguez – Saxophone
 Michelle Rogers – Artwork, Liner Notes
 Anthony Russo – Artwork
 Sadat X – Composer, Vocals
 Godfather Sage – Composer, Producer
 Stephan Said – Composer, Guitar (Acoustic), Vocals
 Stephanie St. John – Vocals
 Jason Samel – Executive Producer, Liner Notes, Mixing, Producer
 Jay Samel – Composer, Djembe, Guitar (Acoustic), Producer, Vocals
 David Sanger – Drums
 Nick Sansano – Mixing, Producer
 Michael Sappol – Composer
 Paul Savage – Engineer, Mixing
 Johnny Lee Schell – Engineer
 Ric Schnupp – Engineer, Mixing
 Luke Schwartz – Bass, Vocals
 Pete Seeger – Composer
 Billy Seidman – Arranger, Guitar, Producer, Vocals
 Samuel Sellers – Composer
 Robin Setal – Bass
 Tony Shanahan – Bass, Vocals
 Yousif Sheronick – Percussion
 Kendall Small – Vocals (Background)
 Fred Smith – Composer
 Godfrey Smith – Composer
 Patti Smith – Composer, Vocals
 Christopher Snyder – Bass, Composer, Guitar, Mixing, Producer, Vocals
 Jill Sobule – Composer, Guitar, Vocals
 Paul Spitz – Spoken Word
 Starna Productions – Producer
 Aaron Steele – Drums
 Chavonne Stewart – Vocals
 Brian Susko – Composer, Mixing, Producer
 David Sutton – Bass
 James Swinburne – Saxophone
 Johnny Temple – Bass
 Thee Oh Sees – Composer
 Jim Thomson – Group Member
 Kevin Tooley – Drums
 John Trudell – Composer, Spoken Word
 Kevin Twigg – Drums, Vocals
 Ruthy Ungar – Vocals
 Unkle – Producer
 Scott Vanderpool – Producer
 John Wade – Drums
 Loudon Wainwright III – Adaptation, Arranger, Guitar, Producer, Vocals
 Matthew Walsh – Composer, Engineer, Group Member, Mixing, Producer
 Don Was – Bass
 Jameson Watral – Vocals
 Tim Watson – Bass
 Dave Way – Engineer
 Taj Weekes – Composer
 Eric Weinrib – Producer, Vocals
 Jason White (singer-songwriter) - Composer, Vocals, Guitar
 Dar Williams – Composer
 Lucinda Williams – Composer, Guitar (Acoustic), Vocals
 Hal Willner – Producer
 Brandon Wind – Guitar (Rhythm)
 Carolyn Wonderland – Composer, Guitar, Trumpet, Vocals, Vocals (Background)
 Chris Woodhouse – Engineer, Mixing
 Ayler Young – Fender Rhodes
 Jeff Young – Organ, Piano, Vocals

Credits adapted from Allmusic.

See also

 Music and politics
 Occupy movement in the United States
 Reactions to the Occupy movement
 We are the 99%

Charts

References

External links
 Occupy This Album
 Music for Occupy Label

2012 compilation albums
Occupy movement